Odyssey is a science fiction novel by American writer  Jack McDevitt.  It was a Nebula Award nominee for 2007. It is set in the 23rd century and "explores the immorality of big business and the short-sightedness of the American government in minimizing support for space travel."

Reception
Carl Hays reviewing in Booklist said "McDevitt's energetic character-driver prose serves double duty by exploring Earth's future political climate and forecasting the potential dangers awaiting humanity among the stars". Kirkus Reviews was slightly more critical calling it "a low-key, reasonably surprising and involving tale, although not among McDevitt's best."  Jackie Cassada reviewing for Library Journal wrote "the author of Chindi and other novels featuring the Academy succeeds in visualizing a believable future of space exploration as well as believable personalities whose lives and loves put a human face on scientific speculation."

Odyssey was nominated for both the Nebula and John W. Campbell Memorial Awards in 2007.

Notes

External links
 Odyssey at Worlds Without End

Novels by Jack McDevitt
2006 American novels
2006 science fiction novels
Novels set in the 23rd century